Thomas Alexander Jackson (12 November 1878 – 9 October 1916) was a Scottish footballer who played as a right back for St Mirren, Bathgate, St Johnstone and Scotland. He is the only serving St Mirren player to have been captain of his country.

Jackson was killed in action during the Battle of the Somme the First World War in France while serving as a Private in the Argyll and Sutherland Highlanders and is buried at Adanac Military Cemetery, Miraumont.

See also
List of Scotland national football team captains

References

Sources

1878 births
1916 deaths
Association football fullbacks
Scottish footballers
Scotland international footballers
St Mirren F.C. players
Bathgate F.C. players
St Johnstone F.C. players
British military personnel killed in the Battle of the Somme
Scottish Football League players
Scottish Football League representative players
British Army personnel of World War I
Argyll and Sutherland Highlanders soldiers
People from Thornliebank
Sportspeople from East Renfrewshire
Military personnel from Glasgow